Martin Piller (born November 14, 1985) is an American professional golfer.

Piller was born in Dallas, Texas and grew up in Duncanville, Texas. He graduated from Texas A&M University. He turned professional in 2008 and won his first start as a pro at the Texas State Open.

Piller has played on the Nationwide Tour since 2009. His first win on Tour was the 2010 Stadion Athens Classic at UGA. He finished the year 8th on the money list and earned his 2011 PGA Tour card.

In January 2011, Piller married Gerina Mendoza, who was a rookie on the LPGA Tour in 2011. The couple has one child, a son, Ajeo James, born April 26, 2018.

Professional wins (7)

Web.com Tour wins (6)

Other wins (1)
2008 Texas State Open

See also
2010 Nationwide Tour graduates
2015 Web.com Tour Finals graduates
2017 Web.com Tour Finals graduates
List of golfers with most Web.com Tour wins

References

External links

American male golfers
Texas A&M Aggies men's golfers
PGA Tour golfers
Korn Ferry Tour graduates
Golfers from Dallas
Sportspeople from Plano, Texas
1985 births
Living people